A.F.C. Uckfield Town is a football club based in Uckfield, East Sussex, England.

History
The club was formed in July 2014 by a merger of Uckfield Town and A.F.C. Uckfield; it adopted Uckfield Town's black and red colours for their home kit and A.F.C. Uckfield's sky blue and navy blue as the away kit. At the time of the merger Uckfield Town were in Division Three of the Sussex County League, whilst A.F.C. Uckfield were in Division Two; the new club took A.F.C. Uckfield's place in Division Two and continued to play at their Oaks ground.

In their first season the club finished second, earning promotion to the Premier Division of the renamed Southern Combination League.

Ground
The club play their home games at the Oaks on Eastbourne Road.

Other teams
The club's reserve team play in the Mid Sussex League, the under-18 team play in the Southern Combination League's Under 18 (East) Division. The under-17s play in the Mid Sussex Youth League, and the women's team in the Sussex Women and Girls League.

Non-playing staff
First Team Manager: Jonny Elwood
Ladies Manager: Jon Wood
Reserve Team Manager: Justin Farrow
Under 18’s Manager: John Chesson
Under 17’s Manager: Nuno Bral
Chairman: Tom Parker
Vice-Chairman: Justin Farrow
Treasurer: Natasha Leppard
Senior Committee Member: James Jenkins
Senior Committee Member: Adrian Saunders
Youth Welfare Officer: Nick Bignell

References

External links
Official website

Southern Combination Football League
Football clubs in East Sussex
Association football clubs established in 2014
Wealden District
2014 establishments in England
Football clubs in England